The following is a list Australian netball international players who have captained the national team in international tournaments such as the Commonwealth Games, the INF Netball World Cup, the World Games, the Constellation Cup, the Netball Quad Series and in other senior test matches.

List

Notes
  Regular captain, Caitlin Bassett, was unable to play due to injury. Gabi Simpson and Caitlin Thwaites took over on-court captain duties.
  At the 2021 Constellation Cup, Caitlin Bassett captained Australia for the first test. Liz Watson captained Australia for the last three. 
  Regular captain Liz Watson, and vice-captain Stephanie Wood were both rested for the 2022 series against England, with Paige Hadley filling in.
  Regular captain Liz Watson was rested for the second match of the series.
  Regular captain Liz Watson and vice-captain Stephanie Wood were both rested for the third match of the series, with Paige Hadley filling in.

Gallery

References

! 
Australian national netball captains
Netball captains
Captains